Crawford Kerr (15 January 1902 – 26 October 1950) was a British athlete. He competed in the men's high jump at the 1924 Summer Olympics.

References

External links
 

1902 births
1950 deaths
Athletes (track and field) at the 1924 Summer Olympics
British male high jumpers
Olympic athletes of Great Britain
Place of birth missing